Union Pacific 4023 is a preserved member of the 4-8-8-4 Big Boy class built by the American Locomotive Company in Schenectady, New York in November 1944. It is one of eight surviving UP Big Boys being preserved across the United States. 4023 also has the distinction of being the only surviving Big Boy that was part of the second group built in 1944, as all the other surviving Big Boys are from the first group built in 1941.

History 
In the early 1940s, the Union Pacific Railroad designed the only simple articulated steam locomotive with a 4-8-8-4 wheel arrangement, which would be known as the "Big Boy" and would be the largest steam locomotive in the world. These locomotives began being constructed in 1941 by the American Locomotive Company in Schenectady, New York, and No. 4023 is one of the last five of these built in 1944. No. 4023 was assigned for fast and heavy freight trains through the Wasatch Mountains and over Sherman Hill.

After its last run took place in 1959, No. 4023 was stored in the UP's scrapline with the other Big Boy locomotives. What might’ve likely been the reason for 4023's mint condition to be saved for preservation is that it was given a class 3 overhaul in 1957. In 1963, No. 4023 was cosmetically repainted to be put on display for that year's National Railway Historical Society (NRHS) Convention in Cheyenne, Wyoming alongside 4-6-6-4 "Challenger" No. 3985 and 4-8-4 "Northern" No. 844. Once the convention was over, No. 4023 was moved along with No. 3985 inside the Cheyenne roundhouse for storage. In 1974, No. 4023 was cosmetically restored and towed to Omaha, Nebraska for static display in front of the Union Pacific's locomotive shops. After the locomotive shops were closed in 1988, No. 4023 was moved to the original Kenefick Park on Abbott Drive, near the former UP shop site. After redevelopment in the area forced the closure of Kenefick Park, No. 4023 was temporarily housed outside of the Durham Museum in Downtown Omaha.

In Spring of 2005, No. 4023 was moved by truck on a highway to a more permanent home at the new location of Kenefick Park alongside EMD DDA40X No. 6900. During one of its cosmetic restorations, several functional appliances were replaced with new, fake appliances, including the safety valves, whistle, lubricators, and a new boiler jacket.

As of 2023, No. 4023 is still on display at Kenefick Park, and it remains the only Big Boy known to have been moved by highway.

References

4-8-8-4 locomotives
4023
ALCO locomotives
Simple articulated locomotives
Railway locomotives introduced in 1944
Individual locomotives of the United States
Standard gauge locomotives of the United States
Preserved steam locomotives of Nebraska